This is a list of notable events in country music that took place in the year 1930.

Events 
 December 31 – Record sales dropped 50% from 1929.

Top Hillbilly (Country) Recordings

The following songs were extracted from records included in Joel Whitburn's Pop Memories 1890-1954, record sales reported on the "Discography of American Historical Recordings" website, and other sources as specified. Numerical rankings are approximate, they are only used as a frame of reference.

Births 
 January 7 – Jack Greene, star of the 1960s and 1970s ("There Goes My Everything") and longtime Grand Ole Opry star (died 2013).
 June 22- Roy Drusky, Grand ole opry star
 September 23 – Ray Charles, blind African-American pop singer who recorded a series of influential country music albums, starting with Modern Sounds in Country and Western Music (died 2004).
 September 28 – Tommy Collins, singer and songwriter who helped create the Bakersfield Sound (died 2000).
 November 20 – Curly Putman, songwriter (died 2016).

Deaths

Further reading 
 Kingsbury, Paul, "Vinyl Hayride: Country Music Album Covers 1947–1989," Country Music Foundation, 2003
 Millard, Bob, "Country Music: 70 Years of America's Favorite Music," HarperCollins, New York, 1993
 Whitburn, Joel. "Top Country Songs 1944–2005 – 6th Edition." 2005.

References

Country
Country music by year